Psari is a village in Messenia, Greece. It is located in the municipal unit of Dorio and has a population of about 600 people. It is the birthplace of Ioannis Charalambopoulos, Markos Ntaras, and Giannakis Gritzalis, and also it is the place where the revolution of Messenia began. Psari means fish.

References 

Populated places in Messenia